The Wellingtons are an Australian power pop band from Melbourne, Australia.  The band has released four albums, including Keeping Up With The Wellingtons (2005), For Friends in Far Away Places (2006), Heading North For the Winter (2008) and In Transit (2011).

Line up 
The current band line-up is:
 Zac Anthony - guitar and vocals
 Kate Goldby - bass guitar and vocals
 Koji Asano/Luke Godeassi - guitar and vocals
 Anna Dobbyn - keyboards
 David Kleynjans - drums

Past members include Steph Hughes, Matt Kulesza, Steve Thomas, Lee Daniel, Amy Walters, and Tosh Sanada.

Early releases 
Following the release of Keeping Up With The Wellingtons in 2005, the band toured the United States. This provided strong sales of the debut album in Japan (through imported sales from Australia) and consequently Japanese label This Time Records signed the band for the release of the album. This led to the band's first Japanese tour in 2006.

Songs from the first album were used in US channel CBS's show How I Met Your Mother and in a variety of Japanese television commercials.

Further releases
The band's second album, For Friends in Far Away Places followed in 2006, again being released first in Japan and in Australia a few months later.

2008's Heading North for the Winter was again released in Japan first on (ThisTime Records) and was subsequently released in Spain (Rock Indiana), the UK (Lojinx), the US (Zip Records) and Australia (Dust Devil Music).

Their fourth album In Transit was released in Japan (ThisTime Records) in July 2011 and was scheduled to be released in Spain (Rock Indiana) and the US (Zip Records) in September/October 2011, with an Australian release to be confirmed. In support of this album, the band will commence a five-week tour of Japan, Spain, Italy, the UK and the US in September 2011.

The band's biggest songwriting influences include Weezer, Elvis Costello, Cheap Trick, Ben Folds, The Lemonheads and Fountains Of Wayne.

Discography

Studio albums
 2005: Keeping Up With The Wellingtons
 2006: For Friends In Far Away Places
 2008: Heading North For The Winter
 2011: In Transit
 2012: Hey Hey (EP)
 2017: End Of The Summer

References

External links
The Wellingtons official site
The Wellingtons official UK site

Victoria (Australia) musical groups
Australian power pop groups
Lojinx artists